Buddleja ramboi is a very rare Brazilian species found only infrequently in the shrubby or grassy fields of Santa Catarina and Rio Grande do Sul. The species was described and named by Smith in 1955.

Description
Buddleja ramboi is a dioecious shrub < 2 m high, with shredding brownish bark. The young branches are roughly quadrangular and tomentose, bearing small oblanceolate leaves 1.5 – 3 cm long by 0.7 – 1.2 cm wide with tomentose surfaces, more densely below. The white inflorescences are 3 – 8 cm long and comprise lax cymose clusters, sometimes with only 1 or 2 flowers; the corolla tubes are 2.5 – 3.5 mm long.

Cultivation
The shrub is not known to be in cultivation.

References

ramboi
Flora of Brazil
Flora of South America
Dioecious plants